Cola Cao is a sugary chocolate drink with vitamins and minerals that originated in Spain and France and is now produced and marketed in several countries. The brand is owned by the Barcelona-based company Idilia Foods (formerly Nutrexpa).

History 
In 1945, José María Ventura and José Ignacio Ferrero, two brothers-in-law from the Gracia neighborhood of Barcelona, Spain, created a soluble cocoa called Cola Cao.

In 1962, they began to broadcast their first advertisements on television, which adapted the radio tune to some cartoons. In 1972, Cola Cao was associated for the first time with the slogan "Olympic food", after becoming a sponsor of the Spanish Olympic team at the 1972 Munich Olympic Games. In the 1980s, "Cola Cao VIT" was produced, an instant and enriched version with vitamins of the classic Cola Cao. It went out of production in the late 1980s.

In 1988, Cola Cao began sponsoring the Spanish Olympic Committee through the ADO Program, an alliance that continues today.  Along the same lines and to promote urban sports, the brand installs what are popularly known as "Cola Cao Circuits" in green areas of a large number of Spanish cities, such as Esplugues de Llobregat and Córdoba, among others. In the mid-nineties, with the slogan the same flavor of Cola Cao with half the calories, a version of Cola Cao without sugar and with sweeteners called "Cola Cao Low in Calories" was launched, which in the mid-2000s was renamed "Cola Cao Light".

Ingredients
Cola Cao is prepared using sugar, processed cocoa, wheat flour and cola nut, and is enriched with vitamins, Calcium and Phosphorus.

Preparation

Cola Cao comes in a powder form which is intended to be mixed with milk, but can also be mixed with water or soya milk. It can also be added to breakfast cereal or used as a baking ingredient. In Spain in particular, Cola Cao is a popular accompaniment to breakfast, or dinner.

Advertising
The "Cola Cao song" used to promote the product in 1952 is a nostalgia item. Its first verses are still remembered: "Yo soy aquel negrito del África Tropical / que cultivando cantaba la canción del Cola Cao /..." ("I am that little black guy from Tropical Africa / who sang the Cola Cao song while cultivating"). The company released a new version of the song in 2020, modifying the lyrics perceived as racist. Cola Cao has been marketed in association with the Olympic Games and other sporting events.

Distribution
Cola Cao in powder form is sold in containers of various sizes, and it is also produced in liquid form that is purveyed in plastic bottles.

Marketing
Cola Cao is exported to various countries such as Spain, Portugal, Chile, Bosnia and Herzegovina, and China (known as 高乐高 Gao-le-Gao), where Nutrexpa offices are located.  It was introduced to Japan (under the name コラカオ), Russia (under the name Кола Као)  and Greece in early 1990s only to be discontinued a few years later, however in 2007 "Cola Cao Chocolate Roll Cakes" manufactured in China are sold at dollar stores.

Cola Cao factories have production lines unique to each region:
 European market: Factory in Barcelona, Spain
 Cola Cao Original, Light, Turbo, Fiber, Energy, Complete and more.
 South American market: Factory in Santiago, Chile
 Cola Cao Original, Light
 Cola Cao Cereal
 Asian market: Factory in Tianjin, China
 Cola Cao Original, Fruit Flavor
 Cola Cao Roll Cake 
 Cola Cao Spread

Online Controversy and Coverage 
The companies Nesquik and Cola Cao have been closely compared to each other online. However on March 31, 2016 a parody Cola Cao Twitter page sparked an argument with a parody Spanish Twitter page. Cola Cao said about how they "have a song" but questioned what Nesquik has instead, "a talking rabbit". The Nesquik account later swore and commented on the signature bits. This resulted in the official pages of the two brands along with companies like Nestlé clarifying the correct and verified company pages.

The OCU also compared the two brands to help to close the arguments online directed at which brand is better. They compared the cocoa contents and added fibers of the two brands and according to the OCU concluded that although other companies provided higher quality chocolate sources, Cola Cao placed 4th: higher than Nesquik. People on Twitter and Facebook argue about which is better and try to bring everyday evidence to suggest that one company has a new product which makes it better than the next; and this has quickly spread onto the local news. For example, on July 6, 2020 McDonald's released the Cola Cao McFlurry which people have used as arguments against Nesquik, questioning if the company have this or not.

See also

 List of chocolate beverages

Footnotes

External links
Official website 
Official Twitter Page

Energy drinks
Chocolate drinks
Spanish brands
Products introduced in 1946